Abraham Léo Errera (4 September 1858 in Laeken – 6 August 1905 in Brussels) was a Belgian botanist, known for his research in the field of plant physiology. He worked at the Free University of Brussels in 1883 as an associate and in 1890 a full professor of botany. In addition, he was actively involved in Jewish affairs.

After receiving his liberal arts degree at the Université Libre de Bruxelles (1874), his focus turned to natural sciences, and in 1879 obtained his doctorate in botanical science. He then travelled to Germany, where he furthered his education at the Universities of Strasbourg, Bonn, and Würzburg. In Strasbourg, he conducted research in the laboratories of Anton de Bary and Felix Hoppe-Seyler. At Würzburg, he studied plant physiology under Julius von Sachs.

Following his return to Brussels, he founded the Laboratoire d'Anatomie et de Physiologie Végétales. This laboratory eventually featured facilities for microscopy and chemistry, a greenhouse, a photography studio, a sterilization chamber, a thermostatic chamber and a darkroom for spectroscopy and polarimetry.

He is credited with discovering the presence of glycogen in plants and fungi (amylopectin) through the use of sophisticated histochemical techniques. He later employed these techniques to detect alkaloids in plants.

In 1886, he published an important observation linking cell division in plants to the behavior of soap bubbles, which came to be known as Errera's Rule: “the cell plate, at the time of its formation, adopts the geometry that a soap film would take under the same conditions."

In 1887 he became a corresponding member of the Academie Royale des Sciences de Belgique, and in 1898 was elected a full member. He died in 1905 at the age of 46 from a cerebral embolism.

Selected works 
In 1893 he published "Les Juifs russes : extermination ou émancipation?" (with a prefatory letter by Theodor Mommsen), a book that was later translated and published in English as "The Russian Jews; extermination or emancipation?" Among his principal scientific works are the following:
 Errera L. A., Clautriau G., Maistriaux M. 1887. Premières recherches sur la localisation et la signification des alcaloides dans les plantes. H. Lamertin, Bruxelles. - on alkaloids.
 Planches de physiologie végétale, 1897 - On plant physiology.
 Une leçon elémentaire sur le Darwinisme, 1904 – Elementary lessons on Darwinism.
 Cours de physiologie moléculaire, 1907 – Course on molecular physiology.
 Recueil d'oeuvres de Léo Errera, 1908 – Collected works of Léo Errera.

References 
 Salomon Wininger: Große jüdische National-Biographie mit mehr als 8000 Lebensbeschreibungen namhafter jüdischer Männer und Frauen aller Zeiten und Länder. Ein Nachschlagewerk für das jüdische Volk und dessen Freunde. Bd. 2, Cernăuți 1926/1927.
 Encyclopaedia Judaica. Das Judentum in Geschichte und Gegenwart., Bd. 6, Eschkol, Berlin 1930.
 The universal Jewish encyclopedia in ten volumes. Bd. 4, New York 1948.
 Académie Royale des Sciences, des Lettres et des Beaux-Arts de Belgique: Annuaire. Bd. 68, Brüssel 1908.

Notes 

1858 births
1905 deaths
19th-century Belgian botanists
19th-century Belgian Jews
20th-century Belgian Jews
Belgian Sephardi Jews
Plant physiologists
20th-century Belgian botanists